Eric Pike (11 November 1936 – 17 June 2021) was a South African Anglican bishop. He was the Bishop of Port Elizabeth from 1993 to 2001.

He was educated at Graaff Reinet Teachers' Training College and was a teacher at Queen’s College Boys' High School from 1958 to 1965. He trained for the priesthood at St Paul’s Theological College, Grahamstown and was ordained in 1968. He was assistant priest at St John’s, East London and then rector of St Paul’s, Komga. From 1978 he was archdeacon of East London and then suffragan bishop of Grahamstown before his election in 1993 to the See of Port Elizabeth as its third bishop. He was in office until 2001.

References and sources

 Who's Who 2008: London, A & C Black, 2008 
 Crockford's Clerical Directory Lambeth, Church House, 1976, ISBN (invalid) 0108153674, alternate version: , 
 Pew Leaflet, 20 June 2021 Cathedral of St Michael and St George, 20 June 2021, 
, .

External links
 Wits Historical papers

1936 births
2021 deaths
20th-century Anglican Church of Southern Africa bishops
Anglican archdeacons in Africa
Anglican bishops of Port Elizabeth
21st-century Anglican Church of Southern Africa bishops